Boško Petrović may refer to:

Boško Petrović (aviator) (1911–1937), Serbian flying ace of the Spanish Civil War
Boško Petrović (writer) (1915–2001), Serbian writer and translator
Boško Petrović (footballer) (born 1975), Serbian footballer
Boško Petrović (musician), Bosnian musician